Charles S. Thompson may refer to: 

 Charles S. Thompson (set decorator) (1908–1994), Hollywood art designer
 Charles S. Thompson (ornithologist) (1881–1960), American ornithologist
 Charles Stewart Thompson (1851–1900), medical missionary in India